The Victoria's Secret Swim Special is a television special that aired on CBS on February 26, 2015 and was broadcast in 190 countries as well as live at the Victoria's Secret website. It cost $2 million to film.

It featured the Victoria's Secret Angels Adriana Lima, Candice Swanepoel, Lily Aldridge, Behati Prinsloo  and Alessandra Ambrosio as well as models Elsa Hosk, Martha Hunt, Jasmine Tookes, Stella Maxwell, Joan Smalls and Jac Jagaciak. There were also musical performances by Maroon 5 and Juanes.

Another 'Victoria's Secret Swim Special' aired on March 9, 2016, featuring the Victoria's Secret models and musical performances by Demi Lovato and Nick Jonas.

Background
Every year Victoria's Secret Angels and models shoot the swimsuit campaign. At the end of 2014, after the annual fashion show, some of them posted pictures on Instagram announcing an upcoming secret project. After rumors of a fashion show featuring the swimsuit line, it turned out being a television special.

It does not feature all of the shoots of Victoria's Secret's 2015 swimsuit collection. Indeed, some pictures were taken at Saint Barthélemy, including some models who are not featured on the television special.

One of the models, Joan Smalls, was born in Puerto Rico and lived there for 19 years.

Then Angel Karlie Kloss was not featured in the broadcast, fueling speculation that she had left the brand, which Edward Razek would later confirm. However, later the same year, all the featured models in the broadcast aside from Smalls would be revealed as part of the brand's newest Angels.

Synopsis
The Victoria's Secret Swim Special shows Angels and models shooting the Victoria's Secret swimsuit catalogue, including underwater shoots. They also talk about their lives and careers, dance to the songs performed by Maroon 5 and Juanes and are said to "tackle jungle treks, underwater shoots and overcome personal fears".

2015
The first edition of the Victoria's Secret Swim Special was filmed in Puerto Rico in December 2014 and premiered on February 26, 2015.

Angels
Candice Swanepoel
Lily Aldridge
Behati Prinsloo
Alessandra Ambrosio
Adriana Lima
Jac Jagaciak
Jasmine Tookes
Elsa Hosk
Martha Hunt
Stella Maxwell

Models
Joan Smalls

Music performers

2016
The second edition of the Victoria's Secret Swim Special took place in St. Barthélemy and premiered on March 9, 2016.

Angels
Candice Swanepoel
Lily Aldridge
Behati Prinsloo
Elsa Hosk
Jasmine Tookes
Josephine Skriver
Lais Ribeiro
Martha Hunt
Romee Strijd
Sara Sampaio
Stella Maxwell
Taylor Marie Hill

Models
Vita Sidorkina

Music performers

Reception
Kate Dries form website Jezebel compared the Victoria's Secret Swim Special to Jurassic Park and the upcoming Jurassic World.

As for Alyssa Bailey from fashion magazine Elle, she found the opening of the Victoria's Secret Swim Special similar to the one of The Hills.

The A.V. Club qualified it "unbearable".

References

External links

Further reading
 
 

2010s American television specials
Victoria's Secret
Television shows directed by Hamish Hamilton (director)